van Schoor is a Dutch, Flemish and Afrikaans surname. Notable people with the surname include:

Guilliam van Schoor (fl 1653--1676), Flemish landscape painter
Ineke Van Schoor, Belgian female acrobatic gymnast.
Karl Van Schoor (1925-unknown), Belgian chess player
Lodewijk van Schoor (c. 1650-1702), Flemish painter, draughtsman and designer of tapestries
Melt van Schoor (born 1967), Namibian cricketer
Raymond van Schoor (born 1990), Namibian cricketer
Ryk van Schoor (1921–2009), South African rugby union player

Afrikaans-language surnames
Surnames of Dutch origin
Dutch-language surnames